The President of the Louisiana State Senate is the highest-ranking member of the Louisiana State Senate. The president convenes the session and calls members to order, and can designate another state senator as the presiding officer.

The Louisiana state senate president is fifth in gubernatorial line of succession in Louisiana. The president's counterpart in the lower house of the Louisiana Legislature is the Speaker of the Louisiana House of Representatives, currently Republican Clay Schexnayder.

History
The Louisiana Constitution of 1812 did not provide for a lieutenant governor to preside over the state senate and allowed the president of the state senate to succeed the governor. The first senate president to succeed to the governorship was Henry S. Thibodaux, who succeeded to the position in 1824 after the resignation of Governor Thomas B. Robertson. In 1829, Governor Pierre Derbigny died in a carriage accident, allowing for Armand Beauvais to become acting governor. Beauvais resigned after only three months in 1830 to run in the special election to fill the post. The new senate president, Jacques Dupré, became the new acting governor until he resigned in 1831 and was replaced by governor-elect André B. Roman.

In the Louisiana Constitution of 1846, the Lieutenant Governor of Louisiana assumed the functions of the state senate presidency. During the Civil War there were two lieutenant governors, one union, and one confederate, as there were two separate state governments. The lieutenant governor presided over the Louisiana State Senate from 1853 until the adoption of the Louisiana constitution of 1974. The current president of the state senate is selected by the governor from among the state senators and is confirmed by their vote.

Powers and duties
Although the president is not the only state senator that can serve as a presiding officer, he holds the power to assign the presiding officer in his absence. During session, the presiding officer controls the flow of debate on the Senate floor, and decides questions of order.

The president controls the state senate offices and chamber, determines the physical arrangement and security of the chamber and committee rooms.

As a state senator, the president is entitled to participate in debate and to vote.

According to Article 4, Section 14, of the Louisiana Constitution, the president is fifth in the gubernatorial line of succession.

List of presidents since 1812

President pro tempore

The President pro tempore is appointed in the same way as the president. The President pro tempore acts as presiding officer in the absence of the president. If the chair is ever permanently vacated the President pro tempore acts as the temporary presiding officer until the Senate elects a new president. The President pro tempore, though not vested with much power, is usually a senior and influence senator. The position has existed since the foundation of the Senate in 1812, but it did not become a permanent position until 1880.

List of presidents pro tempore since 1880

See also
Governor of Louisiana
Lieutenant Governor of Louisiana
Speaker of the Louisiana House of Representatives
 List of Louisiana state legislatures

References

External links
Louisiana Senate

Louisiana
 President
Lists of Louisiana politicians